The Ministry of Women, Genders and Diversity (MMGyD) is a ministry of the Argentine Government tasked with overseeing the country's public policies on issues affecting women and gender and sexual minorities. The ministry was created in 2019, as one of the initial measures of President Alberto Fernández; the first and current minister is Elizabeth Gómez Alcorta.

The ministry overtook the responsibilities of the National Institute for Women (Instituto Nacional de la Mujer; INAM), which existed from 2017 to 2019.

Structure
The Ministry is subdivided into the following dependencies:
Secretariat of Equality and Diversity Policies (Secretaría de Políticas de Igualdad y Diversidad)
Undersecretariat of Equality Policies (Subsecretaría de Políticas de Igualdad)
Undersecretariat of Diversity Policies (Subsecretaría de Políticas de Diversidad)
Secretariat of Policies against Gender-based Violence (Secretaría de Políticas contra la Violencia por Razones de Género)
Undersecretariat for a Comprehensive Approach to Gender-based Violence (Subsecretaría de Abordaje Integral de la Violencia por Razones de Género)
Undersecretariat of Special Programmes against Gender-based Violence (Subsecretaría de Programas Especiales contra la Violencia por Razones de Género)
Undersecretariat of Training, Research and Cultural Policies for Equality (Subsecretaría de Formación, Investigación y Políticas Culturales para la Igualdad)

Headquarters
The Ministry's offices are currently located across three other government facilities, the main one being the one located at Balcarce 186, in the Buenos Aires barrio of Monserrat. In April 2020 the government announced plans to house the whole ministry in the offices at Cochabamba 54, in the barrio of San Telmo.

List of ministers

See also
Feminism in Argentina
LGBT rights in Argentina
Women in Argentina

References

External links
 

Women
Argentina
Argentina
Argentina, Women
2019 establishments in Argentina
Presidency of Alberto Fernández
Women's rights in Argentina